The 1998–99 Fussball Club Basel 1893 season was their 106th season since the club's foundation. Following their promotion in the 1993–94 season this was their fifth consecutive season in the highest tier of Swiss football.
René C. Jäggi was the club's chairman for the third year. FC Basel played their home games in the St. Jakob Stadium until 13 Dezember 1998. From 7 March 199 they played their games in the Stadion Schützenmatte while the new stadium was being built.

Overview

Pre-season
Guy Mathez, who had taken over the coaching in January of that year, was appointed as the new trainer at the start of the season, but on 14 May 1999 he was sacked and was replaced by Marco Schällibaum (ad interim) until the end of the season.

The club made many new signings as the season started, these included Mario Cantaluppi who returned from Servette. Also from Servette came the Romanian international Dan Potocianu and, on loan, the youngster Carlos Varela. Aleksandr Rytchkov was signed from 1. FC Köln and Philippe Cravero signed in from lower classed Etoile Carouge. The Ivorian international Ahmed Ouattara and the young Brazilian Abedi were signed in from Sion. Benjamin Huggel was signed in from local amateur club FC Münchenstein, he had played the previous season for FC Arlesheim, in the fourth tier of Swiss football.

In the other direction Adrian Knup, Daniel Salvi and Jürgen Hartmann all ended their football careers. Dario Zuffi returned to his club of origin Winterthur after having playing five years for the club. Jan Berger moved to Aarau and youngster Alexander Frei was loaned out to Thun so that he could obtain more playing time. Fabinho Santos returned home to Joinville in Brasil.

The first half of the season, until 13 December 1998, Basel's home ground was the St. Jakob Stadium. From 7 March 199 they played their games in the Stadion Schützenmatte and this because the old stadium was demolished and the new stadium was to be built on the same ground. The construction of the new stadium was to be in a little more than two years. The new stadium, the St. Jakob-Park, was to be an all seater, the old stadium had standing places on three sides.

The Campaign

Domestic League
The club's priority aim was to remain in the top flight of Swiss football. The season started fairly well, with five victories and three draws in the first ten rounds. However, seven defeats in the next nine rounds let the team slip down into the bottom areas of the table. Basel ende the qualification stage with eight victories, four draws and ten defeats, with just 21 goals scored and 34 conceded, with 28 points in sixth position in the league table. With this tally they were qualified for Champions Group for the second half of the season. With an average second half of the season, winning five games, drawing four and losing five, Basel in the league tables fifth position, managed to qualify for the 1999 UEFA Intertoto Cup. With four goals in the qualification round and six in the championship round Mario Frick was the teams top goal scorer.

Swiss Cup
All eyes were set on the cup season. But despite a draw against lower classed Stade Nyonnais, Basel's cup season came to an abrupt end, because they were unable to pass this hurdle, losing the match on penalties. Lausanne-Sport won the Swiss Cup final on 13 June 199 in the Wankdorf Stadium, winning 2–0 against Grasshopper Club.

Players 
The following is the list of the Basel first team squad. It includes all players that were in the squad the day the season started on 18 July 1998 but subsequently left the club after that date and it includes all players that transferred in during the season.

Transfers in

Transfers out

Results 
Legend

Friendly matches

Pre- and mid-season

Winter break

Nationalliga A

Qualifying Phase

League table

Champions Group

League table

Swiss Cup

See also
 History of FC Basel
 List of FC Basel players
 List of FC Basel seasons

Sources and references
 Rotblau: Jahrbuch Saison 2015/2016. Publisher: FC Basel Marketing AG. 
 Rotblau: Jahrbuch Saison 2017/2018. Publisher: FC Basel Marketing AG. 
 1998–99 at Joggeli.ch
 1998–99 at RSSSF

External links
 FC Basel official site

FC Basel seasons
Basel